Wildlife smuggling hubs in Asia include:

Myanmar
 Mong La
 Tachileik
 Kyaiktyio
 Three Pagodas Pass
 Muse

Laos
 Vientiane
 Linxia, China

Cambodia
 Preah Monivong (Bokor) National Park
 Phnom Penh

Vietnam
 Pù Mát National Park and Tam Đảo National Park
 Hanoi
 Haiphong
 Vĩnh Yên

Thailand
 Bangkok’s Chatuchak wildlife market
 Mae Sai

Malaysia
Penang
Kuala Lumpur

Singapore
 Singapore

Indonesia
 Whole of Sumatra, especially Kota Lubuk Liggau
 Borneo (Aceh)

India
National parks (NP) throughout the country, from Kaziranga in the Northeast to
Panna in Madhya Pradesh, having been extirpated
in Sariska and Panna NPs as a result of hunting.

China
 Dalou
 Jiegao
 Ruili
 Xishuangbanna
 Kunming
 Nanning
 Pingxiang
 Dongxing
 Haikou
 Guangzhou (especially Chatou Wild Animal market, Qing ping Market, Panjiayuan Market)
 Guangdong
 Xining
 Germu
 Linxia (especially Bei Da Jie market)
 Beijing
 Shanghai,
 Hong Kong
 Lhasa

References and notes

Wildlife smuggling
Crime in Asia